The Houde Bimax is a French ultralight aircraft, designed and produced by Patrice Houde, introduced at the Blois homebuilt aircraft fly-in in September 2010. The aircraft is supplied as a complete ready-to-fly-aircraft.

Design and development
The Bimax was designed to comply with the Fédération Aéronautique Internationale microlight rules. It features a cantilever low-wing, a two-seats-in-tandem enclosed cockpit under a bubble canopy, fixed conventional landing gear and a single engine in tractor configuration.

The aircraft is made from wood, with its flying surfaces covered in doped aircraft fabric. Its  span wing is detachable for ground transportation and storage. Standard engines available are the  Rotax 912UL and the  Rotax 912ULS four-stroke powerplants.

Specifications (Bimax)

References

2010s French ultralight aircraft
Homebuilt aircraft
Single-engined tractor aircraft